Edmond Dauchot (1905 – 1978) was a Belgian photographer, poet and engraver. He was born in Gosselies in the industrial municipality of Charleroi where he worked in the family brickmaking business but gave it up in 1930 to move to the hamlet of Olloron near the village of Nadrin (municipality of Houffalize) in the Belgian Ardenne, which inspired his work for the rest of his life.

External links
Exhibitions 
St-Hubert: l'Ardenne de Dauchot by Olivier Paso in Le Soir, 19 September 2001

Bibliography
Edmond Dauchot, Ardenne bien aimée, with a preface by André Dhôtel, Paris-Gembloux, J. Duculot, 1976
René Hénoumont, Edmond Dauchot : le photographe de l'Ardenne d'autrefois, with an introduction by Georges Vercheval, with a testimony by René Hénoumont and an afterword by André Dhôtel, Tournai, La Renaissance du livre, 2000, 
Jean-Pierre Orban, Edmond Dauchot: Ardenne buissonnière: Journal et photos 1937–1971, Paris-Gembloux, Duculot, 1984, 
Octave Servais, Ardenne: 35 photographies d'Edmond Dauchot, Bruxelles-Liège, PIM services, 1958

1905 births
1978 deaths
Artists from Charleroi
Belgian photographers
Belgian male poets
Belgian engravers
20th-century Belgian poets
20th-century Belgian male writers
Writers from Charleroi
20th-century engravers